Rich is an unincorporated community in Coahoma County, Mississippi, United States.

The settlement is located along the Yazoo Pass waterway.

History
First called Yazoo Pass Station, the settlement was a stop along a now-abandoned section of the Illinois Central Railroad. The present name is derived from the last name of one Mr. Richenberger, a local merchant.

The population in 1900 was 30. A post office operated under the name Rich from 1888 to 1994.

Notable person
 Thomas Harris, writer.

References

Unincorporated communities in Coahoma County, Mississippi
Unincorporated communities in Mississippi